The Jewish Tribune is a privately owned Haredi weekly newspaper based in Stamford Hill with offices in Golders Green, London and Manchester. Founded in 1962, it appears in newspaper form every Thursday, (and on the internet in "pdf" format) providing up to date news from UK Jewish community and Israel along with views, social and cultural reports. It also contains editorials and a spectrum of readers' opinions. Foreign, military and diplomatic correspondent James J. Marlow writes the Middle East articles including features with analysis and matters concerning British politics. Senior UK political and Manchester correspondent is Bezalel Cohen. Eminent historian Dr Yaakov Wise is a contributor.
With a claimed circulation of over 2800 copies being sold each week, the paper is the fifth largest Jewish paper in England after The Jewish Chronicle, the Jewish News, the Jewish Telegraph and Hamodia and is the third oldest continuously published Jewish newspaper in England.

The Jewish Tribune is published by Agudath Israel of Great Britain.

It is the only newspaper published in the UK to have a section in Yiddish.

In August 2010, rumours circulated that the newspaper would fold following the Rosh Hashana edition but the newspaper surmounted its problems and continues to publish.

References

External links
 November 2002
 The Shira Centre
 Jewish Media resources
 Database of Multilingualism in the United Kingdom

Haredi Judaism in the United Kingdom
Jewish newspapers published in the United Kingdom
Weekly newspapers published in the United Kingdom
Publications established in 1962
1962 establishments in the United Kingdom
Yiddish newspapers